Isobel Varley (21 May 1937 – 11 May 2015) was a Guinness World Records-recognized tattooed senior, from Yorkshire, United Kingdom.
She was first named "The World's Most-Tattooed Senior Woman" in 2000.

Biographical and career information 
Varley got her first tattoo, aged 49, at a tattoo convention at the Hammersmith Palais.
According to Guinness over a ten-year period, Varley had over 200 designs inked, covering roughly 93% of her body in tattoos. She reported that "the only areas not completely tattooed is my face, the soles of my feet my ears and some area on my hands." Varley has also estimated to have spent over 500 hours decorating her body.

Death 

Varley died 11 May 2015 at Lister Hospital, Stevenage, United Kingdom after an ongoing battle with Alzheimer's disease.

References

External links 
 

Body modification
British women
1937 births
2015 deaths
People known for being heavily tattooed
Neurological disease deaths in England
Deaths from Alzheimer's disease